The 1972 President's Cup Football Tournament was the second competition of Korea Cup. The competition was held from 20 to 30 September 1972, and was won by Burma for the second time, who defeated Indonesia in the final.

Group stage

Group A

Group B

Knockout stage

Bracket

Seventh place play-off

Fifth place play-off

Semi-finals

Third place play-off

Final

See also
Korea Cup
South Korea national football team results

External links
President Park's Cup 1972 (South Korea) at RSSSF

1972